The 2020 Ohio Democratic presidential primary took place through April 28, 2020, as part of the Democratic Party primaries for the 2020 presidential election. In-person voting, originally scheduled for March 17, 2020 (along with three different states), had been cancelled due to the COVID-19 pandemic. The Ohio primary was a semi-open primary and awarded 154 delegates towards the 2020 Democratic National Convention, of which 136 were pledged delegates allocated based on the results of the primary.

The legislature and governor ultimately made the decision to run an all-mail primary, with no in-person voting, allowing votes to be received through April 28. Former vice president Joe Biden, the only Democrat still in the race, won the primary with more than 72% of the vote and 115 delegates. Senator Bernie Sanders catched 21 delegates, surpassing the threshold with around 17%.

Procedure
The primary, scheduled for March 17, 2020 on the same day as Arizona, Florida and Illinois (whose primaries were not moved), had initially been postponed to June 2 one day before voting day, but was subsequently set to continue by extending mail-in voting until April 28 through a law signed by governor Mike DeWine on March 27. Mails had to be received by post until April 27, with the additional option to hand-deliver mail-in ballots on April 28. It was the only contest on that day, as all six states originally planned for that day postponed their primaries.

In the semi-open primary, candidates had to meet a threshold of 15 percent at the congressional district or statewide level in order to be considered viable. The 136 pledged delegates to the 2020 Democratic National Convention were allocated proportionally on the basis of the results of the primary. Of these, between three and nine were allocated to each of the state's 16 congressional districts and another 18 were allocated to party leaders and elected officials (PLEO delegates), in addition to 29 at-large delegates. As Ohio's primary had originally been planned for a March date on Stage I of the primary timetable, it received no bonus delegates by the Democratic National Committee.

District delegates to the national convention were planned to be elected at post-primary caucuses on April 16, 2020; should candidates have received more delegates based on the results of the primary than delegate candidates presented at the time, then additional delegates would have been nominated during these caucuses. The state executive committee of the party subsequently would have met on May 9, 2020, to vote on the 29 at-large and 18 pledged PLEO delegates for the Democratic National Convention. The delegation also included 18 unpledged PLEO delegates: 12 members of the Democratic National Committee, 5 members of Congress (one senator and four representatives, notably temporary presidential contender Tim Ryan), and former DNC chair David Wilhelm.

Postponement and delay
The primary had originally been scheduled for March 17, 2020. While only the Ohio General Assembly, and not the governor, had the authority to schedule a new election day Republican Governor of Ohio Mike DeWine recommended on March 16 moving the primary election to June amid concerns over the COVID-19 pandemic in the United States. As he did not have the power to unilaterally make this decision, he went to court to support a lawsuit requesting the delay, but a judge rejected the lawsuit. Later in the day, the Health Director ordered the polls closed as a health emergency. Early on March 17, the Ohio Supreme Court denied the challenge to the state and allowed the primary's delay to proceed.

The governor had proposed to the state legislature that June 2 would be the replacement day, but the final joint decision by the legislature and governor was to run an all-mail primary, with voting through April 28.

Candidates
The following people appeared on the ballot in Ohio:

Running
Joe Biden

Withdrawn

Michael Bennet
Michael Bloomberg
Pete Buttigieg
Deval Patrick
Tulsi Gabbard
Amy Klobuchar
Bernie Sanders
Tom Steyer
Elizabeth Warren

Andrew Yang (as well as John Delaney) did not qualify for the ballot due to invalid petitions, with Yang running a registered write-in campaign instead.

Polling

Results

See also
2020 Ohio Republican presidential primary
Impact of the COVID-19 pandemic on politics

Notes 

Additional candidates

References

External links
The Green Papers delegate allocation summary
Ohio Democratic Party delegate selection plan
FiveThirtyEight Ohio primary poll tracker

Ohio Democratic
Democratic primary
2020
Ohio Democratic primary, 2020